Puerto Rico competed at the 2008 Summer Paralympics in Beijing. The delegation consisted of three competitors, one track and field athlete, one sailor, and one sport shooter.

Medalists 
The country won one medal, a bronze.

Track and field athletics

Sailing 

One Puerto Rican athlete, Julio Reguero, competed in the single-person 2.4mR keelboat event. Reguero finished in ninth place out of sixteen sailors.

Key
 (#) = Worst two results discarded
 OCS = On the course side of the starting line (penalty)
 CAN = Race canceled

Shooting

See also
Puerto Rico at the 2008 Summer Olympics

External links
Beijing 2008 Paralympic Games Official Site
International Paralympic Committee

References

Nations at the 2008 Summer Paralympics
2008
Paralympics